A phantom withdrawal is a cash withdrawal from an automatic teller machine where money has been withdrawn from an account, and neither the customer nor the bank admit liability.

If the banks are unable to find any error on their side, they conclude that the withdrawals were done by the customers. Many experts ascribe phantom withdrawals to criminal activity done using the banking network itself.

See also 

  Automated Teller Machine (ATM)
  ATM Industry Association (ATMIA)
  Security of ATMs

References

External links
 - A website devoted to the topic

Automated teller machines